The Central African Republic Council of Ministers consists of 31 members appointed by the president. 

The Council of Ministers is chaired by the president and is tasked with managing government operations and initiating laws.

The information below reflects the composition of the Council as of 11 February 2022. Source:

Members of the Council of Ministers

References

Politics of the Central African Republic